To date, there have been forty-six women and three men who have been married to the British prime minister in office. There have also been four bachelor and nine widower prime ministers; the last bachelor was Edward Heath (1970–1974) and the last widower was Ramsay MacDonald (1924, 1929–1935). The Duke of Grafton (1768–1770) and Boris Johnson (2019–2022) are the only prime ministers to have divorced and remarried while in office.

Current prime minister Rishi Sunak has been married to Akshata Murty since 2009.

Role and duties 
The role of the British prime minister's spouse is not an official one, and as such, they are not given a salary or official duties. Over time the position has evolved, and spouses such as Cherie Blair have gained public attention through their own independent careers and achievements, as well as attending engagements such as the African First Ladies Summit.

Cherie Blair, with Cate Haste, wrote a book about recent prime ministerial spouses, The Goldfish Bowl: Married to the Prime Minister, 1955–1997, in 2005.

List of spouses

See also 
List of prime ministers of the United Kingdom
Spouse of the prime minister of Australia
Spouse of the prime minister of Canada
Spouse of the prime minister of New Zealand

Notes

References 

United Kingdom